Peter Morley may refer to:
 Peter Morley (football club president)
 Peter Morley (filmmaker)